Rúnar Már Sigurlaugarson Sigurjónsson (born 18 June 1990) is an Icelandic professional footballer who plays as a midfielder for Liga I club Voluntari.

He started out his senior career at local team Tindastóll, after which he went on to compete professionally in the Netherlands, Sweden, Switzerland, Kazakhstan and Romania.

Rúnar recorded his full debut for Iceland in November 2012, in a 2–0 friendly win over Andorra in which he scored. He was selected for the UEFA Euro 2016, but did not make any appearances in the tournament.

Club career

Early career
Rúnar started his career at hometown club Tindastóll before switching to HK when he moved to the Capital Region at 17 years of age. He played a season with HK's reserve side, Ýmir, in the lowest league before being promoted to the senior squad, managing by that time to have featured in all four divisions of Icelandic football after appearing in the 2009 1. deild karla.

Valur
After two seasons with HK's senior squad, he switched to Valur before the 2010 Úrvalsdeild season.

Loan to Zwolle
After the 2012 season, on 31 January 2013, Rúnar signed with Dutch Eredivisie side Zwolle on loan until the end of the 2012–2013 season, with an option for two more seasons. Shortly after arriving in the Netherlands he was injured and consequently could not play. In late April it was announced that he would be returning to Valur for the 2013 Icelandic season, although, due to his injury, he could not be sure when he would start playing. Rúnar was cleared to play with Valur on 3 May 2013.

Sundsvall
On 6 August 2013, it was announced that Rúnar had moved to Swedish Superettan side Sundsvall, with Rúnar signing a contract until the end of 2016.

Grasshoppers
In the summer of 2016 he was sold to Swiss Super League club Grasshoppers for a sum around €350,000.

Astana
On 17 June 2019, Rúnar signed for Astana following the expiration of his Grasshoppers contract.

CFR Cluj
On 8 February 2021, Rúnar signed for Romanian team CFR Cluj on a free transfer. Over the course of one and a half seasons, he amassed eight goals from 37 appearances in all competitions and won three domestic trophies.

Voluntari
On 20 December 2022, Voluntari announced the signing of Rúnar.

International career
Rúnar played eight games for the youth sides of Iceland. After a good 2012 season, during which he scored 7 goals, he was picked for the senior squad for a FIFA World Cup 2014 qualifier match against Switzerland in October 2012 but was an unused substitute. A month later he started in a friendly match against Andorra, scoring the second goal of the game on his debut, a 2–0 win for Iceland.

He was selected for UEFA Euro 2016.

Career statistics

Club

International

Scores and results list Iceland's goal tally first, score column indicates score after each Rúnar goal.

Honours
Valur
Icelandic League Cup: 2011

Astana
Kazakhstan Premier League: 2019
Kazakhstan Super Cup: 2020

CFR Cluj
Liga I: 2020–21, 2021–22
Supercupa României: 2020; runner-up: 2021

References

External links

1989 births
Living people
People from Sauðárkrókur
Runar Mar Sigurjonsson
Runar Mar Sigurjonsson
Runar Mar Sigurjonsson
Runar Mar Sigurjonsson
Runar Mar Sigurjonsson
Association football midfielders
UEFA Euro 2016 players
Úrvalsdeild karla (football) players
1. deild karla players
2. deild karla players
3. deild karla players
Allsvenskan players
Superettan players
Swiss Super League players
Kazakhstan Premier League players
Liga I players
Handknattleiksfélag Kópavogs players
Ungmennafélagið Tindastóll men's football players
Valur (men's football) players
PEC Zwolle players
GIF Sundsvall players
Grasshopper Club Zürich players
FC St. Gallen players
FC Astana players
CFR Cluj players
FC Voluntari players
Runar Mar Sigurjonsson
Expatriate footballers in the Netherlands
Expatriate footballers in Sweden
Expatriate footballers in Switzerland
Expatriate footballers in Kazakhstan
Expatriate footballers in Romania
Runar Mar Sigurjonsson
Runar Mar Sigurjonsson
Runar Mar Sigurjonsson
Runar Mar Sigurjonsson
Runar Mar Sigurjonsson